Ravi Kapoor (born 27 June 1969 in Liverpool, England) is a British actor of Indian heritage best known for his roles on Gideon's Crossing and Crossing Jordan. Before relocating to Los Angeles, Kapoor worked for ten years as an actor in England. He trained at East 15 Acting School. Kapoor is married to actress Meera Simhan.

Selected credits
The Starling as Dr. Manmohan, 2021
The Good Doctor (as Minesh Goyal), 2019
The Young and the Restless (as Dr. Samir Jain), 2015
Miss India America (director), 2015
NCIS Bashir Malik, 2014
The Mentalist (as an Indian gas station attendant), 2010
Grey's Anatomy (as an Indian patient), 2009
Fringe 2009
24 (as Muhtadi Gohar, Muslim cleric/imam), 2009
Heroes (as a young Chandra Suresh), 2009
Numb3rs (as a suspected terrorist), 2008
My Name Is Earl (as Earl's doctor), 2008
Crossing Jordan (as Dr. Mahesh "Bug" Vijay), (2001–2007)
Gideon's Crossing (as Dr. Siddhartha "Sid" Shandar), 2000–2001 
Bribery and Corruption (as Detective Sergeant Kahn), 1997
The Peacock Spring (as Hem), 1996
Wild West British Film, 1998

External links

1969 births
Male actors from Liverpool
Male actors from Los Angeles
English emigrants to the United States
British male actors of Indian descent
English male film actors
English people of Indian descent
English male television actors
Living people
English male actors of South Asian descent